Liliane Becker (9 November 1942 – 14 September 1981) was a Luxembourgian gymnast. She competed in five events at the 1960 Summer Olympics.

References

1942 births
1981 deaths
Luxembourgian female artistic gymnasts
Olympic gymnasts of Luxembourg
Gymnasts at the 1960 Summer Olympics
Sportspeople from Luxembourg City